Seventeen Again is an American fantasy–comedy film. It first aired on Showtime on November 12, 2000, and was released on DVD on April 9, 2002. The film was also included as a bonus feature on the Sister, Sister (which ended in May 1999) Complete Collection box set released in March 2016. Directed by Jeffrey W. Byrd, it stars Tia Mowry & Tamera Mowry, and their younger brother Tahj Mowry.

Plot
When the Donovan family moves from California to Connecticut, 17-year-old Sydney (Tia Mowry) finds it is not easy being in a new town away from her old friends and adjusting to her father's remarriage after her mother died some time ago. However, while working at her new job, she encounters Todd (Merwin Mondesir), a boy in her class, whom she has a crush on. However, Ashley (Maia Campbell), his older sister, dislikes her and criticizes her anyway she can. Her 12-year-old genius brother Willie (Tahj Mowry) is happy as long as he can tinker in his lab with his increasingly complex experiments. When another experiment goes wrong, their father, Barry (Phillip Jarrett), forbids him from making more experiments in his lab until he learns responsibility. Willie is convinced he can defeat the aging process, and while devising an experimental anti-aging formula, he accidentally spills some on a bar of soap.

When their grandmother Cat (Hope Clarke) unknowingly uses the tainted soap, she is transformed into a 17-year-old (Tamera Mowry). Her ex-husband Gene (Robert Hooks) follows suit, and is also returned to his teenaged self (Mark Taylor).

Cat and Gene are having a fine time reliving their youth and enjoying the thrill of teenage romance, but there's an error in the ointment. Willie learns his formula could have deadly side effects, and now he must discover an antidote to return his grandparents to their older but healthy bodies. Through their experience as teenagers again Gene and Cat realize they are still in love with each other but Cat is reluctant to believe Gene's feelings are genuine as she is still heartbroken that he chose to leave her for a job in Australia 20 years ago, hence the reason for their divorce.

In Sydney's room, she and Cat finally have a long and heartfelt talk. Sydney admits she's homesick for California and her old friends. She hates Connecticut and the bullying she is subjected to by Ashley and her friends because Todd is interested in her. During that time, Cat admits her earlier experience with Ashley. However unlike Sydney, she was able to stand up to Ashley and earn her begrudging respect. Meanwhile, Gene who has had time to reflect on his life choices, realizes his mistake of leaving his family, and bids farewell to his life as a teenager and the friends he has made, and goes to the dance with Ashley in hopes of reconciling with Cat.

Meanwhile, at the dance, Sydney and Cat arrive and find Gene with Ashley. Gene and Cat share a dance where they reconcile, before Cat passes out due to the side effects of the transformation. Willie arrives with the antidote as Gene carries Cat to the school's pool. Ashley, furious that Gene ditched her for Cat, cuts them off before they can save her. Sydney, having had enough of Ashley and her bullying, punches her in the face. As she and Willie leave to save their grandparents, everyone applauds Sydney for giving Ashley what she deserved. Willie tosses the antidote in the pool and Gene and Cat jump in. Gene asks Cat to marry him again after their crazy experience. Cat says yes, but then the happiness is interrupted by Sydney and Willie's parents, Barry and Monique (Tonya Lee Williams), coming home from a trip. The parents are surprised to see Cat and Gene reconciled and Monique tells him that they should let them babysit next time. Sydney asks Monique if she could help with the wedding plans and she agrees. A call comes in and Willie calls for Barry, who tells him that he's in the shower (with the soap, which they forgot to get rid of). Of course, Sydney and Willie now have to stop their father from using the soap.

Cast
Tia Mowry as Sydney Donovan, Willie's older sister, Barry's daughter, Monique's stepdaughter and Cat & Gene's granddaughter
Tahj Mowry as Willie Donovan, Sydney's younger brother, Barry's son, Monique's stepson and Cat & Gene's grandson
Hope Clarke as Grandma Catherine "Cat" Donovan, Gene's ex-wife
Tamera Mowry as Young Grandma Cat Donovan
Robert Hooks as Grandpa Eugene "Gene" Donovan, Cat's ex-husband
Mark Taylor as Young Grandpa Gene Donovan
Merwin Mondesir as Todd
Phillip Jarrett as Barry Donovan, Monique's husband, Sydney & Willie's father and Cat & Gene's son
Tonya Lee Williams as Monique Donovan, Barry's wife, and Sydney & Willie's stepmother
Maia Campbell as Ashley
Daryn Jones as Terrance
Novie Edwards as Julie

Production notes
Seventeen Again was executive produced by Boyz II Men member Shawn Stockman. Stockman also served as the film's music composer.

Seventeen Again was filmed on location in Toronto, Ontario, Canada. The school scenes were filmed at Eastern High School.

The film went on to find greater popularity throughout the early-mid 2000s from frequent airings on Disney Channel.

Awards and nominations

Reception 
Seventeen Again has a 6.3/10 rating on the Internet Movie Database.

References

External links

2000 films
2000 television films
2000s fantasy comedy films
2000s teen comedy films
American fantasy comedy films
American teen comedy films
Films shot in Toronto
Films about rapid human age change
Showtime (TV network) films
Films scored by Christopher Franke
2000 comedy films
2000s English-language films
Films directed by Jeffrey W. Byrd
2000s American films